Trnové is a city part in the north-western Slovakia, approximately 7  kilometres south-east from Žilina.

History
The city part was first mentioned as a village in 1393.

Geography
It has population of around 3,500 people.

Sights
The city part offers a great view of the Malá Fatra mountains. It is also an entrance point into these mountains. There is a wooden Gothic Roman Catholic church of Saint George built in the 15th century.

Cities and towns in Slovakia